Fleas and Lice are a Dutch crust punk band from Groningen, Netherlands. Three of the members were originally part of Mushroom Attack, also from the Netherlands.  Their records have been released by Skuld Releases in Europe, and Profane Existence Records and Rodent Popsicle Records in the United States.  Since 1993, they have toured multiple times throughout Europe and North America.

Discography
Split Ep - Polish bastards - Hiatus / Fleas And Lice -1993
7" EP - Parasites - 1994
split LP - Fleas and Lice / Bleeding Rectum - 1995
7" split EP - Fleas and Lice / Battle of Disarm -1995
7" split EP - Up The Punx! Fleas and Lice / Assrash - 1996
12" EP - Global Destruction - 1996
7" split EP - Here we go again Fleas and Lice / Boycot - 2000
LP - Recipes for Catastrophes - 2001
split CD - Fleas and Lice / The Restarts - 2002
 track on CD Angry Songs and Bitter Words - 2003 (Ruptured Ambitions)
12” - The Gorse Wine Chronicles (split LP with Bazto Soil). - 2003
CD - Early Years - 2005 (Rodent Popsicle Records)
LP - Prepare For Armageddon - 2005

Current line up
Adam Kemp (vocals)
Esther (vocals)
Pierre (guitar)
Leon (drums)
Stiff (bass)
Jim  (guitar)

Past members
Oene - bass (1995–2002)
Maynard - drums (1993–1998)
Willy - vocals (1996)
Kazimierz deathly (present)
Pelle - drums (1998-2011)

References

External links
 official website
  Fleas and Lice on Myspace
 Fleas and Lice on Last FM

Crust and d-beat groups
Dutch hardcore punk groups
Musical groups from Groningen (city)